Chicago, Burlington and Quincy Depot or Chicago, Burlington, and Quincy Station may refer to:

Any one of many railroad stations of the Chicago, Burlington and Quincy Railroad

Illinois

 Chicago, Burlington and Quincy Railroad Depot (Batavia, Illinois), listed on the NRHP in Illinois, located on the line between Aurora and West Chicago
 Chicago, Burlington & Quincy Railroad Station (Canton, Illinois), listed on the NRHP in Illinois, located on the line between St. Louis and Savanna
 Fulton station (Illinois), located on the line between St. Louis and Savanna, Illinois
 Chicago, Burlington and Quincy Railroad Depot (Oregon, Illinois), listed on the NRHP in Illinois, located on the mainline between Minneapolis and Chicago
 East Dubuque station, located on the mainline between Minneapolis and Chicago
 Plano (Amtrak station), also known as Chicago, Burlington and Quincy Railroad Depot, listed on the NRHP in Plano, Illinois, located on the mainline between Chicago and Denver
 Earlville station, located on the mainline between Chicago and Denver in Earlville, Illinois
 Ottawa station (Illinois), located on the branch line between Montgomery and Streator
 Streator station, located on the branch line between Montgomery and Streator
 La Moille station, located on the line between Mendota and Denrock, Illinois
 Sterling station, located on the line between Shabbona and Sterling, Illinois
 Chicago, Burlington & Quincy Railroad Depot (Wyoming, Illinois), listed on the NRHP in Illinois, located on the line between St. Louis and Savanna
 Macomb station located on the line between Kansas City and Galesburg

Iowa

 Chicago, Burlington and Quincy Station (Burlington, Iowa), listed on the NRHP in Iowa
 Chicago, Burlington and Quincy Railroad Depot (Centerville, Iowa), listed on the NRHP in Iowa
 Chicago, Burlington, and Quincy Freight House-Chariton, Chariton, IA, listed on the NRHP in Iowa
 Chicago, Burlington and Quincy Railroad-Creston Station, Creston, IA, listed on the NRHP in Iowa
 Chicago, Burlington and Quincy Depot (Osceola, Iowa), listed on the NRHP in Iowa
 Chicago, Burlington Northern and Quincy Depot (Red Oak, Iowa), listed on the NRHP in Iowa
 Davenport station (Iowa), located in Iowa

Missouri

 Chicago, Burlington and Quincy Depot (Mound City, Missouri), listed on the NRHP in Missouri

Wisconsin

 La Crosse Depot
 North La Crosse Depot
 Prairie du Chien Depot

See also
Chicago, Burlington, & Quincy Roundhouse and Locomotive Shop, Aurora, IL, listed on the NRHP in Illinois
Chicago, Burlington & Quincy Steam Locomotive No. 710, Lincoln, NE, listed on the NRHP in Nebraska